Wegneria is a genus of moths belonging to the family Tineidae.

Species
Some species of this genus are:
Wegneria acervalis (Meyrick, 1914) (from Malawi)
Wegneria astragalodes (Meyrick, 1922) (from Uganda)
Wegneria cavernicola Diakonoff, 1951
Wegneria cerodelta (Meyrick, 1911) (from India, Japan, Malaysia, Korea, Taiwan, Thailand)
Wegneria chrysophthalma (Meyrick, 1934) (from Uganda)
Wegneria encharacta  (Meyrick, 1915) (from India)
Wegneria impotens  (Meyrick, 1915) (from India)
Wegneria lachanitis (Meyrick, 1906) (from India, Sri Lanka)
Wegneria oxydesma  (Meyrick, 1918) (from India)
Wegneria plasturga  (Meyrick, 1911) (from India)
Wegneria panchalcella (Staudinger 1871) (from Algeria, Canaries, Greece, Hungary and Ukraine)
Wegneria scaeozona (Meyrick, 1920) (from Kenya)
Wegneria speciosa (Meyrick, 1914) (from Nigeria)
Wegneria spherotoma  (Meyrick, 1911) (from India)
Wegneria subtilis  (Diankonoff, 1955)  (from New Guinea)
Wegneria villiersi (Viette, 1955) (from Guinea)

References
Diakonoff, 1951 . Zool. Meded. Leiden 31 : 131.

Hieroxestinae
Tineidae genera
Taxa named by Alexey Diakonoff